Robert Thomas Ducey (born May 24, 1965) is a Canadian former professional baseball outfielder who played for six teams in Major League Baseball (MLB). Ducey is currently a hitting coach for the Fubon Guardians of the Chinese Professional Baseball League (CPBL).

Career
He ended his 13-year major league career with a .242 batting average and 31 home runs in 703 games.

Ducey was part of a Major League anomaly in 2000, when he was traded by the Phillies to the Blue Jays on July 26 for minor league pitcher John Sneed, and was then traded by the Blue Jays back to the Phillies on August 7 for Mickey Morandini.

Ducey served as a designated hitter for Team Canada in the 2004 Summer Olympics, which finished in fourth place. As a result, he became the first Canadian to have played for both of Canada's MLB teams, Expos and Blue Jays, in addition to the Canadian Olympic team. Matt Stairs, Denis Boucher and Shawn Hill are the only other Canadian ballplayers to achieve such distinction.

Subsequently, Ducey spent one year each in the New York Yankees' and Expos organizations as a minor league hitting coach, before being hired in 2006 by the Blue Jays as a talent scout. His responsibilities included covering both the major and minor leagues, as well as spring training camp before moving to the Pacific Rim department. In October 2009, he was dismissed by then-new Jays general manager Alex Anthopoulos when coverage of Asia was not a priority for the organization.

Afterwards, Ducey was hired to scout for the Tampa Bay Rays in the 2011 season, then joined the Phillies minor league system in 2014, again serving as a hitting coach.

Highlights
In 1986, Ducey was honored with the prestigious Tip O'Neill Award, and later was inducted in the Canadian Baseball Hall of Fame in 2013. Following his induction, Ducey joined Terry Puhl and Larry Walker as the only Canadian baseball players to achieve both of those milestones.

In between, Ducey gained induction into the Cambridge Sports Hall of Fame in 2006.

Personal life
Rob currently lives in Tarpon Springs, Florida, with his wife Yanitza and their sons Thomas and Aaron and their daughter Jenaka.

See also
List of Major League Baseball players from Canada

References

External links
]
Rob Ducey at Sports Reference Olympic Sports
Rob Ducey at Pura Pelota (Venezuelan Professional Baseball League)

1965 births
Living people
Adirondack Lumberjacks players
Baseball players from Toronto
Baseball players at the 2004 Summer Olympics
Black Canadian baseball players
California Angels players
Canadian baseball coaches
Canadian expatriate baseball players in Japan
Canadian expatriate baseball players in the United States
Cardenales de Lara players
Canadian expatriate baseball players in Venezuela
Florence Blue Jays players
Knoxville Blue Jays players
Major League Baseball outfielders
Major League Baseball players from Canada
Medicine Hat Blue Jays players
Minor league baseball coaches
Montreal Expos players
Nippon Ham Fighters players
Nippon Professional Baseball outfielders
Oklahoma City 89ers players
Olympic baseball players of Canada
Philadelphia Phillies players
Scranton/Wilkes-Barre Red Barons players
Seattle Mariners players
Seminole State Raiders baseball players
Sportspeople from Cambridge, Ontario
Syracuse Chiefs players
Tacoma Rainiers players
Tampa Bay Rays scouts
Texas Rangers players
Toronto Blue Jays players
Toronto Blue Jays scouts
Ventura County Gulls players
Canadian Baseball Hall of Fame inductees